The 2018 China Championship (officially the 2018 Evergrande China Championship) was professional ranking snooker tournament, that took place between 24 and 30 September 2018 in Guangzhou, China, with qualifying took place from 19 to 22 August 2018 in Preston, England. It was the fourth ranking event of the 2018/2019 season.

Luca Brecel was the defending champion, but he lost to Martin O'Donnell 3–5 in the first round. Mark Selby won the event, defeating John Higgins in the final 10–9. Selby's win was his 15th professional ranking event win.

Prize fund
The event had a prize pool of £725,000, with the following breakdown for the player's reaching the following positions.
 Winner: £150,000
 Runner-up: £75,000
 Semi-final: £32,000
 Quarter-final: £20,000
 Last 16: £13,000
 Last 32: £7,500
 Last 64: £4,000
 Televised highest break: £4,000

The event also had a "rolling 147 prize" for a maximum break, which stood as £5,000.

Main draw 
The main draw of the event featured 64 players. Players in bold denote match winners.

Top half

Bottom half

Final

Qualifying
These matches were held between 19 and 22 August 2018 at the Preston Guild Hall in Preston, England. All matches were best of 9 frames.

Notes

Century breaks

Main stage centuries
Total: 29

 144  Ali Carter
 136, 108  Mark Williams 
 131  Anthony Hamilton
 128, 111  Yan Bingtao
 127  Jamie Jones
 126  Graeme Dott
 125  Ding Junhui
 124, 102  Lyu Haotian
 121  Fergal O'Brien
 120  Neil Robertson
 118, 108, 100  Mark Selby
 117  Peter Ebdon 
 113  Stuart Bingham
 111, 102  Judd Trump
 110  Luo Honghao
 110  Zhao Xintong  
 108  Shaun Murphy
 108  Yuan Sijun
 108  Hossein Vafaei 
 105  Scott Donaldson
 103  Liang Wenbo
 101  Mark Allen 
 100  Ryan Day

Qualifying stage centuries
Total: 31

 138  Joe Perry
 135  Liam Highfield
 135  Martin Gould
 131  Jak Jones
 124, 103  Mark Allen
 123, 109  Ryan Day
 123  Shaun Murphy
 122  David Gilbert
 121  Peter Ebdon
 118  Mark Selby
 117, 114  Stephen Maguire
 117  Graeme Dott
 115  Liang Wenbo 
 114  Billy Joe Castle
 112  Tian Pengfei
 109  John Higgins
 109  Zhang Anda
 106, 101  Chen Zifan
 106  Tom Ford
 106  Niu Zhuang
 105  Jamie Jones
 103  Stuart Carrington
 102  Noppon Saengkham
 102  Mark Williams 
 101  Marco Fu
 101  Neil Robertson
 100  Jimmy Robertson

References

China Championship (snooker)
China Championship
China Championship
China Championship